Netball Central is an Australian netball venue located in Sydney Olympic Park, New South Wales. Between 2016 and 2018, due to a naming rights arrangement, it was known as the Genea Netball Centre. The venue is owned by Netball New South Wales. It serves as their headquarters and as the main training base for New South Wales Swifts and Giants Netball. It was a host venue for the 2015 Netball World Cup and the 2018 Invictus Games. As well as netball, Netball Central regularly hosts martial arts, volleyball, table tennis, badminton and basketball tournaments and competitions.

History

Construction
In February 2011, Netball New South Wales announced their plans to build a new Netball Centre of Excellence in Sydney Olympic Park. Construction work began on the projection in 2013, with the "turning of the sod" taking place on Sunday, 17 February 2013. The architects were Scott Carver Architects and the builder was Probuild, while the Arup Group acted as consultants. Netball Central was the first sports facility to be built at the park since the 2000 Summer Olympics. Located on Olympic Boulevard, it was built on land in front of the State Sports Centre. One of its most distinctive features is a gable-roofed portal frame of laminated veneer lumber. The finished project cost $35m and was funded by the Australian Government, the Government of New South Wales, the Sydney Olympic Park Authority and Netball New South Wales.

Opening
On Monday, 1 December 2014, Netball New South Wales moved into Netball Central. It was officially opened on 6 February 2015 with a ceremony attended by Wendy Archer, the Netball NSW President, Carolyn Campbell, the Netball NSW CEO, Stuart Ayres, a Government of New South Wales minister and Craig Laundy, the Member of Parliament for Reid. It was originally due to be officially opened in December 2014 but was the ceremony was cancelled due to the Lindt Cafe siege.

During its first year open, Netball Central hosted three major netball tournaments. In February 2015 New South Wales Swifts hosted the 2015 ANZ Championship Official Pre-Season Summer Shootout. The tournament featured all ten ANZ Championship teams. This was the first major netball tournament to be held at the venue. In April 2015, Netball Central hosted the under-17 and under-19 Australian National Netball Championships tournaments. New South Wales finished as under-19 champions and as under-17 runners-up. In August 2015 Netball Central was a host venue for the 2015 Netball World Cup. It was the official training venue for all sixteen participating teams. It also hosted pool matches, play-offs and placing games.

Tenants
Netball Central serves as the headquarters for Netball New South Wales and as the main training base for New South Wales Swifts and Giants Netball.

Between 2015 and 2019, Netball Central regularly hosted Australian Netball League matches. Both NNSW Waratahs and Canberra Giants played home matches at the venue. The venue also hosted the 2016 ANL Final Series. In the grand final Waratahs lost 53–46 to Victorian Fury.

Since 2016, Netball Central has been the host venue for the Netball NSW Premier League. It also hosts numerous other netball competitions organised by Netball New South Wales, including the Dooleys Metro League.

In 2016, Sydney Warriors and Sydney Amazons announced that they would play their home matches for the 2016 Australian Volleyball League and Australian Women's Volleyball League seasons at Netball Central.

Facilities
Netball Central features six timber sprung courts, including a show court which seats 860.

Events hosted
Netball Central regularly hosts martial arts, volleyball, table tennis, basketball tournaments.

Naming rights sponsor

References

External links
  Netball Central on Facebook
  Netball Central on Twitter

New South Wales Swifts
Giants Netball
Netball venues in New South Wales
Volleyball venues in Australia
Basketball venues in Australia
Sports venues in Sydney
Sydney Olympic Park
2014 establishments in Australia
Sports venues completed in 2014